Urban & Schwarzenberg was a German academic publishing company, specializing in medical literature. It was founded as a book store in 1866 in Vienna. It acquired the Wiener Medizinische Presse in 1876, marking the start of Urban & Schwarzenberg as a medical publisher. In 1898, the company opened an office in Berlin, which soon after became its new head office. The company relocated to Munich in 1949. 

Urban & Schwarzenberg was acquired by the American company Waverly (parent of Williams & Wilkins) in 1990. Urban & Schwarzenberg was acquired by Verlagsgruppe Georg von Holtzbrinck in 1998. In 1999, it was merged with another publishing house owned by Georg von Holtzbrinck, and became Urban & Fischer. In 2003, Urban & Fischer was acquired by Elsevier.

References

Literature
Hundert Jahre Urban & Schwarzenberg. 1866–1966, Munich, 1966

Book publishing companies of Germany
Elsevier
Publishing companies established in 1866
1866 establishments in the Austrian Empire
Publishing companies of Austria
Publishing companies of Germany
Academic publishing companies
Companies based in Vienna
Companies based in Berlin
Companies based in Munich